The Scientific Committee on Emerging and Newly Identified Health Risks (SCENIHR) is one of the independent scientific committees managed by the Directorate-General for Health and Consumer Protection of the European Commission, which provide scientific advice to the Commission on issues related to consumer products.

Activities 

The SCENIHR provides scientific opinions on questions concerning emerging or newly identified risks on non-food products, as well as on broad, complex or multidisciplinary issues requiring a comprehensive assessment of risks to consumer safety or public health not covered by other risk assessment bodies.

Examples of areas of activity include new technologies (such as nanotechnologies), medical devices, antimicrobial resistance, physical risks (such as noise and electromagnetic fields), and methodologies of risk assessment.

Procedures 

SCENIHR's scientific advisory procedures are based on the principles of scientific excellence, independence and transparency.

See also 

The Directorate-General for Health and Consumer Protection also manages two other independent Scientific Committees on non-food products:

 The Scientific Committee on Consumer Safety (SCCS)
 The Scientific Committee on Health and Environmental Risks (SCHER)

For questions concerning the safety of food products, the European Commission consults the European Food Safety Authority (EFSA).

References

External links 

 Scientific Committee on Emerging and Newly Identified Health Risks
 The Scientific Committees of the Directorate-General for Health and Consumer Protection
 Commission Decision 2008/721/EC of 5 August 2008 setting up an advisory structure of Scientific Committees and experts in the field of consumer safety, public health and the environment (as amended) from EUR-Lex

Health and Consumer Protection
Health and the European Union